Rajabhau Ganeshrao Thakre is a Bharatiya  Janata Party politician from Yavatmal district, Maharashtra. He was the member of the Maharashtra Legislative Assembly from Yavatmal Assembly Constituency.

References

India MPs 1996–1997
1952 births
Living people
Marathi politicians
Bharatiya Janata Party politicians from Maharashtra
Lok Sabha members from Maharashtra
People from Yavatmal district
Members of the Maharashtra Legislative Assembly
Nationalist Congress Party politicians from Maharashtra